The men's discus throw event at the 1988 Summer Olympics in Seoul, South Korea had an entry list of 29 competitors from 20 nations, with two qualifying groups before the final (12) took place on Saturday October 1, 1988. The maximum number of athletes per nation had been set at 3 since the 1930 Olympic Congress. The event was won by Jürgen Schult of East Germany, the nation's first victory in the men's discus throw and first medal since 1976. Romas Ubartas of the Soviet Union took silver, while Rolf Danneberg of West Germany earned bronze. Danneberg was the 10th man to win multiple discus throw medals, adding to his 1984 gold. For the first time, the United States competed in the event but did not make the podium (the Americans had previously failed to win a medal in the men's discus throw only in 1980, when the nation boycotted the Olympics).

Background

This was the 21st appearance of the event, which is one of 12 athletics events to have been held at every Summer Olympics. The returning finalists from the 1984 Games were gold medalist Rolf Danneberg of West Germany, silver medalist (and 1976 gold medalist) Mac Wilkins of the United States, fourth-place finisher Knut Hjeltnes of Norway, and ninth-place finisher Erik de Bruin of the Netherlands. Jürgen Schult of East Germany was favored; he had won the 1987 world championships and set a world record of 74.08 metres in 1986 that still stands as of 2020.

Nigeria and Paraguay each made their debut in the men's discus throw. The United States made its 20th appearance, most of any nation, having missed only the boycotted 1980 Games.

Competition format

The competition used the two-round format introduced in 1936, with the qualifying round completely separate from the divided final. In qualifying, each athlete received three attempts; those recording a mark of at least 64.00 metres advanced to the final. If fewer than 12 athletes achieved that distance, the top 12 would advance. The results of the qualifying round were then ignored. Finalists received three throws each, with the top eight competitors receiving an additional three attempts. The best distance among those six throws counted.

Records

Prior to the competition, the existing world and Olympic records were as follows.

Jürgen Schult's first throw in the final broke the Olympic record, setting a new one at 68.82 metres.

Schedule

All times are Korea Standard Time adjusted for daylight savings (UTC+10)

Results

Qualifying

Final

See also
 1986 Men's European Championships Discus Throw (Stuttgart)
 1987 Men's World Championships Discus Throw (Rome)
 1990 Men's European Championships Discus Throw (Split)
 1991 Men's World Championships Discus Throw (Tokyo)

References

External links
  Official Report

D
Discus throw at the Olympics
Men's events at the 1988 Summer Olympics